Cameron Venables (born 29 October 1975) is a former Australian rules footballer who played with Collingwood in the Australian Football League (AFL).

Venables, a defender, started his career at the Subiaco Football Club and was rookie listed by AFL club Fremantle. He crossed to Claremont for the 1998 season and at the end of the year was picked up by Collingwood in the 1999 Pre-Season Draft. After playing only three senior games in 1999 he was delisted by Collingwood and spent the next two seasons with Glenelg, before returning to Claremont.

References

External links
 
 

1975 births
Australian rules footballers from Western Australia
Collingwood Football Club players
Claremont Football Club players
Subiaco Football Club players
Glenelg Football Club players
Living people